Martine Gutierrez (born 1989) is an American visual and performance artist. Gutierrez is known for creating artworks that interrogate how identity is formed, expressed, and perceived. The artist has created music videos, billboard campaigns, episodic films, photographs, live performance artworks, and a satirical fashion magazine investigating identity as both a social construct and an authentic expression of self. Gutierrez's artworks have been exhibited in galleries and museums worldwide and were exhibited in the Central Pavilion at the 58th Venice Biennale.

Education and early exhibitions 
Gutierrez received a BFA in printmaking from Rhode Island School of Design in 2012. Following graduation, the artist relocated to New York City.

In 2013 Gutierrez's Real Dolls (2013), a series of photographs depicting the artist's performance of four different life-size sex dolls in various domestic settings, was exhibited alongside Gutierrez's multi-part video Martine Pt 1-3 in the artist's first solo exhibition held at the Ryan Lee Gallery in New York. Images from Gutierrez's Real Dolls series were shown in Disturbing Innocence, a group exhibition curated by artist Eric Fischl which took place at the FLAG art Foundation in 2014 and included Robert Gober, Cindy Sherman, David Salle, Laurie Simmons, and Lisa Yuskavage among others.

Gutierrez's Real Dolls images were also included in the 2015 exhibition About Face at Dartmouth's Hood Museum, which explored the various approaches that contemporary artists have used to investigate identity as a culturally constructed phenomenon. The exhibition included works by Chuck Close, Rineke Dijkstra, Nikki S. Lee, Sarah McEneaney, Nomusa Makhubu, Bruce Nauman, Wendy Red Star, Cindy Sherman, Kiki Smith, and Jeff Wall.

In 2014 Gutierrez created the photographic series Lineups, which features the artist dressed and posed to blend seamlessly with groupings of glamorous female mannequins Gutierrez staged in highly stylized tableaux. Discussing LineUps with art critic Hilarie Sheets, Gutierrez states, "This body of work was my first inclination in realizing that I wanted to be seen as a woman." Miss Rosen who interviewed Gutierrez about the LineUps series writes, "Martine embodies some of the most seductive and alluring images of the feminine, revealing the ways in which the body becomes the work of art itself, ready to be cast in the shape of our ideals."

Gutierrez's 2015 exhibition at Ryan Lee Gallery, Martín Gutierrez: Can She Hear You, included photographs, an installation of disassembled mannequins, paintings, and music videos, all of which Gutierrez produced.

2015 was the last year in which Gutierrez was published identifying with male or gender neutral pronouns before transitioning to female pronouns.

Through experimentation with various artistic techniques and processes, Gutierrez's artworks inspire and ignite a multitude of conversations relating to complex social topics and issues. In a 2018 Vice Magazine interview with the artist, Miss Rosen notes, "Gutierrez uses art to explore the intersections of gender, sexuality, race, and class as they inform her life experience. The Brooklyn-based artist uses costume, photography, and film to produce elaborate narrative scenes that combine pop culture tropes, sex dolls, mannequins, and self-portraiture to explore the ways in which identity, like art, is both a social construction and an authentic expression of self."

#MartineJeans 
#MartineJeans (2016) was a 10 foot by 22 foot fictional advertisement Gutierrez produced for a billboard at the corner of 37th Street and 9th Avenue in New York City in December 2016. Completed during the artist's Van Lier Fellowship in residence at ISCP, Gutierrez's public art project was created with support from the New York Community Trust, Edward and Sally Van Lier Fund, the New York City Department of Cultural Affairs in partnership with the City Council, and the New York State Council on the Arts. The billboard portraying the artist topless, wearing only denim jeans, was designed by Gutierrez to look like a real advertising campaign for a high-end fashion brand featuring the artist performing the role of the supermodel. Interviewed about the project, Gutierrez stated, "I am using the mechanisms of billboard advertising and marketing color schemes to host performances of non-binary gender representation in a consumable way. To the unsuspecting eye, JEANS is a real billboard that puts forth an existing product by a seemingly cis woman—it’s all very stealth." For Gutierrez, the project allowed the artist to claim "my body and how I could use it, project it outwards." Gutierrez reveals, "I inherently have an aesthetic that could be paralleled to fashion imagery or product merchandising; I depend on my constructed fantasies to convince viewers that they should rest on their preconceived notions of what they are seeing. In reality, things aren’t what they appear to be: locations are sets, people are mannequins, I was not born female." Gutierrez's interest in producing a body of work continuing the concept of #MartineJeans evolved into the artist's acclaimed satirical fashion magazine Indigenous Woman (2018).

Girlfriends 
Girlfriends (2014) is a series of black-and-white photographs throughout which Martine Gutierrez poses with a single mannequin, creating ambiguous characters within changing realities. Composed and shot in upstate New York at the cottage of Gutierrez’s grandmother, the photographs depict three different couples, each of whom Gutierrez appears to match with her mannequin counterpart. Gutierrez’s utilization of mannequins is apparent in Girlfriends, as with many of her artworks. Historically, during the mid-1960s, the form of the mannequin experienced an artistic change in which it was used to  "…convey a feeling of overwhelming reality, convincing spectators…that they may be standing next to a real person. This illusion would be achieved by suggesting movement through pose and through the display artist's staging of the mannequin in a way that felt ‘real’." Commenting on her usage of the medium, Gutierrez emphasizes the idealistic aspect of mannequins, stating "‘Mannequins very succinctly represent the artificial, especially in materiality, when compared to the imperfect reality of the human body…But in coaxing the viewer’s misinterpretation, misleading with light and guise, I am looking for the place where those two worlds meet.’"

Indigenous Woman 
Indigenous Woman (2018) is a 146-page art publication (masquerading as a glossy fashion magazine) celebrating "Mayan Indian heritage, the navigation of contemporary indigeneity, and the ever-evolving self-image," according to the magazine's "Letter From the Editor" written by Gutierrez. "Mine is a practice of full autonomy," Gutierrez states. "All photography, modeling, styling, makeup, hair, lighting, graphic design, and product design, I have executed myself." The art critic Andrea K. Scott writes of the project, "The [magazine’s] front and back covers are clearly modeled on Andy Warhol’s Interview magazine, down to the jagged cursive font that spells out the title. Inside, a hundred and forty-six pages are filled with Vogue-worthy fashion spreads—and the ad campaigns that make them possible—featuring Gutierrez playing the roles of an entire agency’s worth of models. In addition to posing, [Gutierrez] also took every picture, styled every outfit, and designed all the layouts." By deliberately employing strategies of image making used in the fashion and advertising worlds, Gutierrez states, "I am pioneering an image that is to be consumed and engineered to be read as commercial. I had to study the visual language of advertising." "I was driven to question how identity is formed, expressed, valued, and weighed as a woman, as a trans woman, as a Latinx woman, as a woman of indigenous descent, as a femme artist and maker," Gutierrez stated in her editor's letter. In a 2018 interview with Vice discussing the making of Indigenous Women, Gutierrez notes, "I’m asking what signifies a real, authentic, native-born woman? It’s a critique and a simultaneous investigation of what claim over these labels, stereotypes, and iconographies I have."
An artist must assume many roles as they experiment with inspiration and creativity and Gutierrez has been seen assuming many throughout the creative process,"Here, Gutierrez assumes the role of editor, writer, model, designer, ad executive, and photographer, with fictional advertising and high-fashion spreads where the artist continually reinvents herself throughout its pages. As the artist states, "Indigenous Woman marries the traditional to the contemporary, the native to the post-colonial, and the marginalized to the mainstream in the pursuit of genuine selfhood, revealing cultural inequities along the way. This is a quest for identity. Of my own specifically, yes, but by digging my pretty, painted nails deeply into the dirt of my own image I am also probing the depths for some understanding of identity as a social construction." For her FOCUS exhibition, the artist will present photographs from the Indigenous Woman series.

Other work 
The artist's music has been used by Dior and Acne Studios in video editorials, and Saint Laurent set its 2012 resort collection video to the artist's single "Hands Up."

In 2014, the artist's site-specific large-scale video installation RedWoman91 (2014), featuring Gutierrez posing in an "advertising red" jumpsuit, exuding "withering sexual power alternating with hesitant vulnerability", was installed in the windows of Ryan Lee Gallery New York, positioned to be visible to those walking on the Highline.

Gutierrez collaborated with i-D magazine in 2015, co-directing a music video with musician SSION that stars the artist alongside mannequins dressed in costumes by French designer Simon Porte Jacquemus. The video titled The Girl For Me accompanies original music written and produced by Gutierrez.

Beginning as an installation commissioned by Aurora in 2015, Gutierrez produced and performed in collaboration with musician Nomi Ruiz in Origin, a digitally streaming selfie performance simultaneously filmed in-front of a live audience. The music, produced by Gutierrez originally written for Ruiz to perform, also titled ‘Origin’ was released on iTunes in 2018. Gutierrez states, "By talking about our ‘origin’, I felt like I could confront bigotry and stereotypes but still tempt listeners to challenge their social constructs of what femininity or identity means to them."

Gutierrez's nine-part film Martine Part I-IX (2012-2016) dismantles gender identity through a semi-autobiographical story of the artist's personal transformation. Gutierrez spent six years creating the work and premiered the final segment in 2016 in the artist's solo exhibition WE & THEM & ME, at the Contemporary Art Museum, Raleigh, North Carolina. The film was also exhibited in Gutierrez's solo exhibition True Story held at the Boston University Art Gallery in 2016.

Filmed in Brooklyn, Tulum, Oakland, and Miami, Gutierrez produced and directed the music video Apathy (2018) for the artist's song by the same name.

In 2019 Gutierrez wrote, produced, and performed in Circle, an immersive live performance series held at Performance Space New York. The sci-fi thriller casts Gutierrez as Eve, an alien held captive by a secret bio weaponry cooperation known as Circle.

Exhibitions and public collections 
Guiterrez's artworks were exhibited in the 58th International Art Exhibition - La Biennale di Venezia, curated by Ralph Rugoff. Gutierrez exhibited photographs from Indigenous Woman including images from the artist's Body En Thrall and Demons series.

In 2019 the artist's work was presented in the solo exhibitions Martine Gutierrez Body en Thrall at the Australian Centre for Photography, Darlinghurst and Life / Like: Photographs, Mount Holyoke College Art Museum, South Hadley. Gutierrez's work was included in Crack Up - Crack Down, Ljubljana Biennial of Graphic Arts curated by Slavs and Tartars; Kiss My Genders, Hayward Gallery, Southbank Centre, London, UK; Transamerica/n: Gender, Identity, Appearance Today, McNay Art Museum, San Antonio, TX; and in Be Seen: Portrait Photography Since Stonewall, Wadsworth Atheneum Museum of Art, Hartford, CT which explored how artists have used portrait photography to challenge, subvert, and play with societal norms of gender and sexuality.

In 2019, photographs from the artist's Indigenous Woman series were exhibited in Gutierrez's solo exhibition Focus: Martine Gutierrez organized by the Modern Art Museum of Fort Worth,Texas. The installation on view 2019 through 2020 included select images from the series Queer Rage, and several advertisements from Indigenous Woman. Gutierrez also installed a site-specific 15 by 70 foot mural in the gallery depicting a fanciful colonial landscape.

Artworks by Gutierrez are in the collections of the Bowdoin College Museum of Art, Brunswick, ME; Crystal Bridges Museum of American Art, Bentonville, AR; Iris & B. Gerald Cantor Center for Visual Arts, Stanford University, Stanford, CA; The Frances Lehman Loeb Museum, Vassar College, Poughkeepsie, NY; Hood Museum of Art, Dartmouth College, Hanover, NH; McNay Art Museum, San Antonio, TX; Milwaukee Art Museum, Milwaukee, WI; Modern Art Museum of Fort Worth, Fort Worth, TX; Museum of Modern Art, New York, NY; Rhode Island School of Design Museum of Art, Providence, RI, Kunstmuseum Bonn, the New Museum, New York, the Museum of Contemporary Art, San Diego, the Rose Art Museum, the New Britain Museum of American Art, and Brandeis University, Waltham, Massachusetts.

Publications and commissions 
The artist's photograph Masking, Starpepper Mask (detail) (2018) from Indigenous Woman (2018) was the January 2019 cover of Artforum.

The artist's photograph Demons, Tlazoteotl, Eater Of Filth from Indigenous Woman (2018) was the cover of RISDXYZ, print Spring/Summer 2019.

Gutierrez's series Showgirls Of The Mountains was commissioned for Swarovski Book of Dreams, print Volume 3, 2019, features original Swarovski crystal jewelry designed by Gutierrez in collaboration with Michael Schmidt.

A suit of self-portraits of Gutierrez titled Xotica created in Tulum Mexico, was a feature for Garage Magazine, print Issue 16, 2019.

Interview Magazine commissioned group portraits of Gutierrez and the artist's friends, titled Catfight, print April 2019. The fashion shoot styled by Gutierrez is documented in a behind the scenes video. Gutierrez comments in Interview, "Magazines and advertising and now, more than ever, social media, are the codes that the next generation is learning from. Being a trans woman of color, it’s like, no shade, but don’t just invite us in. Give us marginalized folks autonomy over our own image so that we can at least voice our own ideas instead of them being appropriated by the mainstream."

Personal life 
Gutierrez was born April 16, 1989 in Berkeley, California and moved to Vermont during high school. Gutierrez is of blended ancestry—the artist has an American mother and a Guatemalan father. The art critic Barbara Calderon writes of Gutierrez's personal identity, "The art, fashion, and media worlds use terms like Latinx, indigenous, trans, queer, and bi-racial to describe [Gutierrez], but these labels often function as reductive shorthand for a range of experiences." Gutierrez has stated, "Language never seemed like a way to clarify who I was. I was afraid of getting roped into a category or being pigeon-holed." "For a long time I have been living fluid concepts of gender with an awareness that the space between the binaries is the only place to find complete freedom. I didn’t want to necessarily hit people over the head with these themes. I wanted the viewer to walk away with some new awareness about their own perceptions of gender and sexual reality—and I still feel this way.

In a 2018 interview Gutierrez states, "My authenticity has never been to exist singularly, whether in regard to my gender, my ethnicity, or sexual orientation. My truth thrives in the gray area, but society doesn’t yet allow an open consciousness to celebrate ambiguity, and we are told who we should be. But it’s up to you to consider everything and be open, otherwise how will you know if your life is real or just a reenactment?" 

Martine Gutierrez joined the social media platform Instagram in the year 2013; the account’s first photographic post to the media was on September 18, 2013. Gutierrez uses this platform, as well as many other social media platforms, to inspire other artists, beginner or advanced, to be creative through regular postings of previous artworks made, current artworks that are currently being processed, and first-hand looks into the life of Martine Gutierrez. In Gutierrez’s first handful of posts, the photos had limited captions and left the viewer guessing. However, Gutierrez has since used Instagram as a platform to involve followers in previous pieces, such as Indigenous Woman, etc., quoting from Indigenous Woman, Body En Thrall, 2018, reminiscing and continuing to keep the ideas within this artistic process flowing and relative to today’s issues and discussion topics, "While our social power structure perpetuates the lineage of historical oppression and conquest, presented is a contemporary reorientation of idealized bodies whose oppression is nuanced through intimacy and inequality. 
One of the oldest storytelling conventions—the white male adventurer who "discovers" the indigenous women i.e. fertile land—has been endlessly employed in mainstream media via science fiction, Disney and Anime, often down-playing colonialism as the force that propels the narrative. Without fail, these romantically-charged narratives are driven by the temptation of the exotic, brown, female body," says Gutierrez on her Instagram post caption on October 12, 2020. Instagram

The artist currently lives and works in Brooklyn, New York.

References 

21st-century American women artists
21st-century American artists
American contemporary artists
American women performance artists
American performance artists
1989 births
Living people